Smidt is a surname. In many cases, it is a spelling variation of the German surname Schmidt. Notable people with the surname include:

Eric Smidt, American businessman
Heinrich Smidt (1798–1867), German writer
Hendrik Jan Smidt (1831–1917), Dutch politician
J. H. Smidt van Gelder (1887-1969), Dutch pediatrician and art collector
Johann Smidt (1773–1857), German politician and theologian
Johannes Smidt (1887–1973), Norwegian theologian and priest
Karoline Smidt Nielsen (born 1994), Danish footballer
Karl Smidt (1903–1984), German naval commander
Kristian Smidt (1916–2013), Norwegian literary historian
Mathias Bay-Smidt (born 1996), Danish badminton player
Orville Smidt (born 1943), American politician
Rupert de Smidt (1883–1986), South African cricketer
Steen Smidt-Jensen (born 1945), Danish athlete
Wolbert Klaus Smidt (1936-2016), German secret service official, diplomat and publicist